This is the list of chapters and colonies of  Phi Iota Alpha, the oldest intercollegiate Greek-letter fraternity established for men of Latino descent.  Entities are divided into chapters, colonies, and inactive chapters. The organization was founded on the campus of Rensselaer Polytechnic Institute in 1931 and was re-established in the spring semester of 1984 after the fraternity witnessed a 6 academic years of inactivity. Over the years, members of Phi Iota Alpha's entities include many professionals men of diverse occupations (including several former presidents of Latin American countries).

Lettered Chapters

Colonies

California State University, Los Angeles
California State Polytechnic University, Pomona
Emporia State University
George Washington University
Johns Hopkins University
Kent State University
New Mexico Highlands University
Roosevelt University
State University of New York at Cortland
State University of New York at Farmingdale
Texas Woman's University
University of Central Arkansas
University of Chicago
University of Cincinnati
Xavier University

Inactive Chapters

Notes

Phi Iota Alpha
Lists of chapters of United States student societies by society
Hispanic and Latino American organizations